HMS Networks AB is an international company in the field of Industrial Information and Communication Technology (Industrial ICT). HMS is headquartered in Halmstad, Sweden and is listed on the Nasdaq Nordic stock exchange, employing 700 people in 16 countries and with reported sales of 145 million Euro in 2020. HMS stands for "Hardware Meets Software" referring to the fact that HMS products allow industrial hardware to be connected to IoT software.

Products 
HMS manufactures and markets industrial communication products that connect industrial devices to different industrial networks and IoT systems. HMS products act as translators between robots, control systems, motors, sensors, etc. and the different industrial networks that exists in the market (fieldbuses and Industrial Ethernet). HMS also offers a portfolio of wireless products as well as remote solutions for web-based control of field equipment such as PLCs, electric generators, machines, telecommunication base stations, building management systems and the likes.

HMS markets products under the following brands:
 Anybus. Multi-network connectivity within fieldbus and industrial Ethernet. With Anybus, one can connect any industrial device to any industrial network. Wired or wireless.
 Ixxat. Connectivity solutions for embedded control, energy and automotive testing. Ixxat products enable communication inside machines and between components in various industrial fields.
 Ewon. Remote access and management of industrial equipment. With Ewon, one can monitor and control field equipment and machinery online.
 Intesis. communication solutions for building automation.

Organization and history 
HMS has operations in 16 countries: Sweden (Halmstad), Germany (Karlsruhe, Ravensburg, Wetzlar, Buchen), Belgium (Nivelles), Spain (Igualada, Barcelona), United States (Chicago, Boston), China (Beijing), Japan (Yokohama), The Netherlands (Hedel, Rotterdam), Italy (Milan, Brescia), France (Mulhouse), Romania (Sibiu), UK (Coventry, Manchester), Singapore, UAE (Dubai), South Korea (Seoul), India (Pune). In addition, distributors in 50 countries resell the HMS products on local markets.

HMS was founded in 1988 by Nicolas Hassbjer and has been deemed "Export Company of the Year" by the Swedish Trade Council.
 Product development of Anybus products is handled by Business Unit Anybus in Halmstad, Sweden.
 Product development of Ixxat products is handled by Business Unit Ixxat in Ravensburg, Germany.
 Product development of Ewon products handled by Business Unit Ewon in Nivelles, Belgium.
 Product development of Intesis products handled by Business Unit Intesis in Igualada, Spain.
 Four Market Units handle local sales and support: MU Americas, MU Asia, MU Continental Europe and MU Northern Europe ROW.
 Manufacturing takes place in Sweden, Latvia and China.

References

Companies established in 1988
Software companies of Sweden
Swedish brands
Companies based in Halland County